Yuichi Tohmori from the NTT Electronics, Kanagawa, Japan was named Fellow of the Institute of Electrical and Electronics Engineers (IEEE) in 2015 for contributions to tunable semiconductor lasers for optical fiber communications.

References

Fellow Members of the IEEE
Living people
Year of birth missing (living people)
Place of birth missing (living people)